Isiah John "Juice" Williams (born November 19, 1987) is a former American football quarterback. He played college football at Illinois. After his senior year of high school in 2005, Williams was considered a top recruit for the quarterback position.

Early life
Isiah John Williams is the son of Stanley and Anita Williams. Mrs. Williams nearly died at birth due to his large size of 13 pounds and 8 ounces. He has two brothers and one sister. He was born the youngest of four siblings.

Williams was dubbed "Juice" by his grandmother because of his large size as a child. "I was kind of big … you know, big and juicy, I guess."

He was a high school honor student and attended the same school as former Illinois star Dick Butkus: Chicago Vocational High School. Williams is active both in his church and local community.

Recruiting

College career

2006: Freshman year
Williams played in the first four games of the 2006 football season, splitting time with senior quarterback Tim Brasic. He threw his first collegiate touchdown pass (a 76-yarder to Rashard Mendenhall) in the third game of the year against Syracuse. In the 4th game of the season, Williams made his first collegiate start in a losing effort vs Iowa.

On September 30, 2006, Williams led the Illini on a game-winning 4th-quarter drive for a 39-yard field goal that gave the team a 23–20 upset victory over host Michigan State. Illinois came into the game as 26-point underdogs. It was the team's first conference victory since the 2004 season. Williams finished with 122 yards passing, one touchdown pass, and 103 yards rushing.  Illinois could not keep the momentum from the Michigan State game, losing the remainder of their games (several by less than a touchdown and two on last second field goals). Williams displayed inconsistency in his game finishing the season with a completion percentage below 40 and passing for fewer than 100 yards in the season's final three games.

2007: Sophomore year
Williams was injured in the second quarter of the season opening loss to Mizzou and kept out of the second half for precautionary reasons. Williams showed improvement in his accuracy in the 3+ drives he was in, throwing 9 balls, 6 of which were caught for 59 yards. Williams had mediocre games in the Illini's first 3 victories over Western Illinois, Syracuse, and Indiana. Williams had average numbers in Illinois' back-to-back victories against ranked teams, defeating Penn State and Wisconsin.

It seemed as if Illinois' promising 5–1 start may have been a fluke, as they proceeded to drop their next two games, a 10–6 loss at Iowa and a 27–17 defeat against Michigan in Champaign. Williams threw for a combined 168 yards and 1 touchdown and 1 interception in the two losses. 
The Illini, however, turned it around in their next two games in victories over Ball St and Minnesota. Williams had perhaps his best game to that point vs Minnesota totaling over 300 yards on offense (203 passing, 133 rushing) and scoring 3 touchdowns (2 passing and 1 rushing).

Yet, the best was yet to come as Williams had what some consider his greatest game at Ohio Stadium versus the top ranked Buckeyes.  Williams led Illinois to a 28–21 upset over Ohio State, its first win over a #1 ranked team since 1956. During this game he threw for 4 touchdowns and completed 12 passes of 22 attempts.  He threw a total of 140 yards and rushed for 70 yards. Williams amassed over 350 yards of offense en route to a 41–22 victory over in state rival Northwestern in the regular season finale. Williams totaled over 2,200 yards of offense and scored 20 touchdowns, as he led the Illini to a 9–3 record and their first bowl berth since the 2002 Sugar Bowl. Illinois was selected to play against perennial power USC in the Rose Bowl, the Illini's first time playing in the Rose Bowl since 1984. Illinois would lose the game 49–17, with USC scoring 28 points off of 4 Illinois turnovers (2 interceptions and 2 fumbles on runs after completions. Williams threw for his highest passing yard total to date (245), but had no touchdown passes and 2 interceptions.

2008: Junior year
Illinois entered the 2008 season ranked as the #20 team in the nation, despite the loss of Big Ten MVP Rashard Mendenhall. Williams and the Illini opened the season vs. Missouri, and despite one of the best passing games in Illinois history where Williams threw for 451 yards and 5 touchdowns, the Illini lost to 6th ranked Missouri 52–42. The Illini would pick up their first win of the season vs Eastern Illinois, where Williams amassed 174 yards rushing with 2 touchdowns in the 47–21 victory. Williams and the Illini struggled in a 20–17 victory over Louisiana-Lafayette, in which Williams amassed just over 180 yards of total offense. After a bye week (the first at Illinois under Ron Zook), the Illini traveled to Penn State and fell 38–24, with Juice passing for 183 yards and rushing for another 64. Illinois next traveled to Michigan and Juice amassed 431 yards of total offense (310 passing, 121 rushing, 4 total touchdowns), which is both the most total yards in Michigan Stadium history and the most given up by any Michigan team, as the Illini won 45–20. The Illini fell flat vs Minnesota the following week, losing 27–20 despite Williams throwing for a career-high of 462 yards along with 2 touchdowns. Williams had a solid game vs Indiana, passing for 271 yards and 4 total touchdowns.

2009: Senior year
Illinois entered the 2009 season unranked. On August 3, 2009 Williams was named to the 2009 Davey O'Brien National Quarterback Award Watch List. Then On August 27, 2009 Williams was named to the 22-man watch list for the 2009 Johnny Unitas Golden Arm award, given to the nation's top senior signal-caller.

Williams was pulled out of a game against Ohio State for throwing 2 key interceptions. Coach Zook announced on October 5 that Juice will be benched in favor of Eddie McGee.

Williams and his Fighting Illini finished a losing 2009–2010 season on December 5, 2009 to Fresno State. During that game Juice Williams surpassed former Illini Jack Trudeau to become second in team history with 56 career touchdown passes.

Career stats
Statistics up to date as of October 11, 2008. High School stats from Rivals.com. College Stats from ESPN.

Passing

Rushing

Professional career

Chicago Bears
Williams went undrafted in the 2010 NFL Draft.  The Chicago Bears invited Williams to attend a rookie mini-camp tryout. The Bears already had Jay Cutler, Caleb Hanie, and rookie Dan LeFevour on the roster. During the offseason, Chicago also picked up Todd Collins and Matt Gutierrez. Williams did not receive any other invitations from professional teams.

On October 4, 2010 after a game against the New York Giants in which both starting QB Cutler and 2nd-stringer Todd Collins were knocked out of the game, Williams tweeted that the Bears had contacted him and that he was "high on [their] list." However, he was never added to the roster.

Chicago Slaughter
From 2013 through 2014 Williams was a regular player for the Chicago Slaughter indoor football team.

Chicago Blitz
When the Slaughter decided to sit out the 2014 season, Williams signed with the Chicago Blitz of the Continental Indoor Football League.

Central Penn Capitals
In February 2016, Williams signed with the Central Penn Capitals of American Indoor Football (AIF).

Personal life
In March 2014, Williams accepted a position as the University of Illinois' director of alumni and former player relations. In April 2015, Williams left Illinois to join the Georgetown athletic development staff to join his wife who accepted a job in Georgetown's law department. In 2017, Williams left Georgetown to become a financial advisor at Merrill Lynch's Washington, DC office. He is now a financial advisor at Northwestern Mutual in Maryland.

References

External links
Illinois Fighting Illini football bio

1987 births
Living people
African-American Christians
African-American players of American football
American football quarterbacks
Chicago Slaughter players
Chicago Blitz (indoor football) players
Chicago Vocational High School alumni
Illinois Fighting Illini football players
Players of American football from Chicago
Central Penn Capitals players
21st-century African-American sportspeople
20th-century African-American people